Wolfgang Pesendorfer (born 1963) is a professor of economics at Princeton University. He specializes in choice theory, game theory, and political economy.

Selected works
Faruk Gul and Wolfgang Pesendorfer, Temptation and Self-Control, Econometrica 2001.
Faruk Gul and Wolfgang Pesendorfer, Self-Control and the Theory of Consumption, Econometrica 2004.
Faruk Gul and Wolfgang Pesendorfer, Random Expected Utility, Econometrica 2006.

External links
Homepage

1963 births
Living people
21st-century American economists
University of California, Los Angeles alumni
Princeton University faculty
Fellows of the Econometric Society
Fellows of the American Academy of Arts and Sciences